Teresinha de Jesús Correia is a Brazilian paralympic athlete. She participated at the 2016 Summer Paralympics in the athletics competition, being awarded the bronze medal in the women's 100 metres event on T47 class.

References

External links 
Paralympic Games profile

Living people
Place of birth missing (living people)
Year of birth missing (living people)
Brazilian female sprinters
Athletes (track and field) at the 2016 Summer Paralympics
Medalists at the 2016 Summer Paralympics
Paralympic medalists in athletics (track and field)
Paralympic athletes of Brazil
Paralympic bronze medalists for Brazil
21st-century Brazilian women